Veliki Dol is a village in the Municipality of Sežana in the Littoral region of Slovenia next to the border with Italy.

The parish church in the settlement is dedicated to Saint James and belongs to the Diocese of Koper.

References

External links
Veliki Dol on Geopedia

Populated places in the Municipality of Sežana